Abass Baraou (born 28 October 1994) is a German professional boxer who has held the WBC International light-middleweight title since 2019. As an amateur he won a bronze medal at the 2017 World Championships and a gold at the 2017 European Championships, both while competing at welterweight.

Early life
Baraou was born on 28 October 1994 in Aalen, Germany. Shortly after his birth, his family returned to their homeland of Togo, where he spent the first nine years of his life before moving back to Germany and settling in Oberhausen. When he was 13 years old, the energetic Baraou attended a trial boxing training session offered at a youth center near his apartment. Although he didn't like it all that much, thinking it was too boring, he was spotted by a trainer that saw him hit the punching bag and persuaded him to continue training with him.

He became the first German in seven years to win a gold medal at the continental stage when he took first place in the welterweight event at the 2017 European Championships in Ukraine, upsetting the favorite Pat McCormack in the final. Later that year at the World Championships in Hamburg he reached the semi-finals of the welterweight tournament, where he fell to two-time Olympic medalist Roniel Iglesias.

He was also a three-time national champion and a three-time winner of the prestigious Chemistry Cup.

Amateur results

2012 Youth National Championships in Cologne, Germany (welterweight)
 Defeated Sandro Thalmann 22–10
 Defeated Hasan Ozer AB2
 Defeated Johannes Simsch 21–10 
2012 Brandenburg Youth Cup in Frankfurt, Germany (welterweight)
 Defeated Adam Sakhnini (Sweden) 14–8
 Defeated Michał Ostrowski (Poland) 18–8
 Lost to Igor Kharitonov (Russia) 9–15 
2012 Youth World Championships in Yerevan, Armenia (welterweight)
 Defeated Yurik Mikaelyan (Armenia) 22–14
 Defeated Manjeet Singh (India) RSC2
 Lost to Osman Aydin (Turkey) 9–14
2013 U-21 National Championships in Moers, Germany (welterweight)
 Defeated Besir Ay 3–0
 Defeated Jan Ualikhanov 3–0
 Defeated Malek Ezzeldinne 3–0 
2014 Chemistry Cup in Halle, Germany (welterweight)
 Defeated Slawa Kerber (Germany) 2–1
 Defeated Michael Gunitzberger (Austria) 3–0
 Defeated Stephen Donnelly (Republic of Ireland) 2–1
 Defeated Liu Wei (China) 2–0 
2014 U-21 National Championships in Moers, Germany (welterweight)
 Defeated Daniel Kornmeier TKO2
 Defeated Hrach Movsisyan 2–1
 Defeated Olcay Simsek 3–0 
2014 National Championships in Straubing, Germany (welterweight)
 Defeated Darian Neumann TKO2
 Defeated Harun Guler 3–0
 Defeated Slawa Kerber 3–0 
2015 European Games in Baku, Azerbaijan (welterweight)
 Defeated Andrei Hartsenko (Estonia) 3–0
 Lost to Parviz Baghirov (Azerbaijan) 0–3
2015 Chemistry Cup in Halle, Germany (welterweight)
 Defeated Viktor Agateljan (Czech Republic) 3–0
 Defeated Igor Nesterov (Ukraine) 3–0
 Lost to Byambyn Tüvshinbat (Mongolia) 1–2 
2015 National Championships in Straubing, Germany (welterweight)
 Defeated Alan Unadzhev 3–0
 Defeated Arthur Krischanowski TKO3
 Defeated Slawa Kerber 3–0 

2016 Chemistry Cup in Halle, Germany (welterweight)
 Defeated Byambyn Tüvshinbat (Mongolia) 3–0
 Defeated Ilya Ochkin (Kazakhstan) 3–0
 Defeated Andrey Zamkovoy (Russia) WO
 Defeated Arajik Marutjan (Germany) WO 
2016 Beogradski Pobednik in Belgrade, Serbia (welterweight)
 Defeated Roberto Queiroz (Brazil) 2–1
 Lost to Daniyar Eleusinov (Kazakhstan) 1–2 
2016 World Olympic Qualifying Tournament in Baku, Azerbaijan (welterweight)
 Defeated Josh Nyika (New Zealand) KO
 Defeated Eumir Marcial (Philippines) 2–1
 Defeated Bahtiyor Mirzomukhammad (Tajikistan) 3–0
 Lost to Imre Bacskai (Hungary) 0–3
2016 National Championships in Straubing, Germany (welterweight)
 Defeated Olcay Simsek 3–0
 Defeated Elah Al-Magamseh TKO3
 Defeated Magomed Schachidov 3–0 
 Defeated Jonathan Zumbe 3–0 
2017 Chemistry Cup in Halle, Germany (welterweight)
 Defeated Sergey Margaryan (Russia) UD
 Defeated Xavier Kohlen (Netherlands) UD
 Defeated Ablaikhan Zhussupov (Kazakhstan) MD 
2017 Beogradski Pobednik in Belgrade, Serbia (welterweight)
 Defeated Sion Yaxley (Wales) 5–0
 Defeated Vasile Belous (MLD) RSCI3
 Defeated Maulen Oskenbek (Kazakhstan) 5–0
 Defeated Andrey Zamkovoy (Russia) WO 
2017 European Championships in Kharkiv, Ukraine (welterweight)
 Defeated Miroslav Kapuler (Israel) 4–1
 Defeated Alexandros Tsanikidis (Greece) 4–1
 Defeated Vincenzo Mangiacapre (Italy) 3–2
 Defeated Vasile Belous (Moldova) 5–0
 Defeated Pat McCormack (England) 4–1 
2017 World Championships in Hamburg, Germany (welterweight)
 Defeated Juan Solano (Dominican Republic) 4–0
 Defeated Byambyn Tüvshinbat (Mongolia) 5–0
 Lost to Roniel Iglesias (Cuba) 1–4

Professional career
Baraou made his professional debut under legendary trainer Ulli Wegner on 28 April 2018, defeating undefeated compatriot Artur Mueller via fourth-round technical knockout (TKO) at the Baden Arena in Offenburg. In his second fight he took the German  light-middleweight title from Denis Krieger (14–5–2, 9 KO) with a ten-round unanimous decision (UD) victory over the Moldovan-born fighter. As the final bell rang, Krieger spat at Baraou and insulted him in the post-fight interview. The Hanover crowd booed him as he offered the fans in attendance both middle fingers several times while exiting the venue. Four months later, on 6 October, Baraou retained his belt against Robert Maess (22–1, 20 KO), the man Krieger had originally beaten for the title in January. He knocked his opponent down with a powerful left in the second round, and even though Maess was saved by the bell, he retired in his corner to give Baraou the victory.

On 16 February 2019, less than ten months after his pro debut, he defeated Mexican former world champion Carlos Molina by unanimous decision after twelve rounds for the vacant WBC International light-middleweight title. In May he defeated former IBO world champion Ali Funeka in Frankfurt, stopping the 41-year-old veteran in the fifth round. He followed that up with his first fight abroad, a TKO victory over Egyptian prospect Abdelghani Saber (8–0–1, 8 KO) at the Caesars Palace in Dubai. After Baraou dropped him once in the first round, he floored him again with a body shot in the second that he was not able to get up from. One and a half months later he defended his WBC International title against John O'Donnell on the undercard of the Regis Prograis–Josh Taylor World Boxing Super Series super lightweight final at The O2 Arena in London. Baraou sent him to the canvas late in the sixth round, and continued his attack after O'Donnell got to his feet, prompting the referee to stop the fight with one second left in the period.

After a main event stoppage victory over Mexican rival Abraham Juarez in Hamburg in January 2020, Baraou moved to England to train under the tutelage of highly regarded coach Adam Booth. His second title defense was announced for 4 April against Nick Klappert (28–3, 15 KO), but was canceled due to the COVID-19 pandemic in Germany.

Professional boxing record

References

External links
 

Living people
1994 births
German male boxers
Light-middleweight boxers
AIBA World Boxing Championships medalists
Boxers at the 2015 European Games
European Games competitors for Germany
German people of Togolese descent
People from Aalen
Sportspeople from Stuttgart (region)
Sportspeople from Oberhausen